Shelkovnikov is a rural locality (a khutor) in Volnenskoye Rural Settlement of Koshekhablsky District, Adygea, Russia. The population was 304 as of 2018. There are 4 streets.

Geography 
Shelkovnikov is located 43 km south of Koshekhabl (the district's administrative centre) by road. Volnoye is the nearest rural locality.

References 

Rural localities in Koshekhablsky District